The 1987 Bracknell Forest Borough Council election took place on 7 May 1987, to elect all 40 members in 19 wards for Bracknell Forest Borough Council in England, having been renamed from Bracknell District Council. The election was held on the same day as other local elections as part of the 1987 United Kingdom local elections. The Conservative Party repeated its feat of 1983 by winning all 40 seats.  The split between the SDP–Liberal Alliance and the Labour Party continued to aid the Conservative dominance - in four wards, the Conservatives got less than 50%, but in only two was their percentage margin of victory in single digits. By seat count and percentage vote share, it remains Labour's worst performance for either Bracknell District or Bracknell Forest.

Ward results
An asterisk (*) denotes an incumbent councillor standing for re-election

Ascot

Binfield

Bullbrook

College Town

Cranbourne

Crowthorne

Garth

Great Hollands North

Great Hollands South

Hanworth

Harmanswater

Little Sandhurst

Old Bracknell

Owlsmoor

Priestwood

Sandhurst

St. Marys

Warfield

Wildridings

References

Bracknell
Bracknell Forest Borough Council elections